Mora may refer to:

People
 Mora (surname)

Places

Sweden
 Mora, Säter, Sweden
 Mora, Sweden, the seat of Mora Municipality
 Mora Municipality, Sweden

United States
 Mora, Louisiana, an unincorporated community
 Mora, Minnesota, a city
 Mora, Missouri, an unincorporated community
 Mora County, New Mexico
 Mora, New Mexico, a census-designated place and the county seat
 Mora River, partially in Mora County
 Mora, Washington, a former settlement

Elsewhere
 Mora, Cordillera, Bolivia
 Mora, Cameroon, a town
 Mora (canton), San José, Costa Rica
 Mora, Cyprus, a village
 Mõra, Estonia, a village
 Mora, Maharashtra, India, a port serving the town of Uran
 Mora, Portugal, a municipality
 Mora, Spain, a town and municipality in the province of Toledo
 Mora de Rubielos, a town in Aragón, Spain
 Morea Eyalet (Ottoman Turkish: Eyālet-i Mōrâ), a former Ottoman Empire province in what is now Greece
 1257 Móra, an asteroid

Sports
 Mora CF, a Spanish football team
 Mora IK, an ice hockey club in Mora, Sweden
 IFK Mora, a sports club in Mora, Sweden
 IFK Mora Fotboll, a football club in Mora, Sweden

Warfare
 Mora (military unit), an ancient Spartan unit of about 600 soldiers
 First Battle of Mora, an 1847 battle of the Mexican–American War
 Second Battle of Mora, an 1847 battle of the Mexican–American War

Other uses
 Mora (album), a 2011 album by Hungarian industrial nu metal band FreshFabrik
 MORA (aviation), minimum off-route altitude
 Mora (drink), a drink consisting of blackberry juice, water and sugar
 Mora (fish), a genus of fish in the family Moridae
 Mora (plant), a genus of plants in the pea family Fabaceae
 Mora (linguistics), a unit of sound
 mōra, the modern Japanese equivalent; see On (Japanese prosody)
 Mora (music store), a music download store by Sony
 Mora Banc Grup, joint name of two Andorran banks
 Mora (mythology), in Slavic mythology
 Mora (ship), the flagship of William the Conqueror
 Mora station, Busan, South Korea, a railway station
 Mora clock, a type of 19th-century Swedish longcase clock
 Mora knife, a type of knife made by various makers in Mora, Sweden
 Cyclone Mora, a tropical cyclone that affected Bangladesh in 2017

See also
 Siege of Mora, in World War I
 Mora v. McNamara, a 1967 US Supreme Court case
 Stones of Mora, the place where Swedish kings were elected
 De la Mora (disambiguation)
 
 Morea (disambiguation)
 Moria (disambiguation)
 Morra (disambiguation)
 Moras, a commune in France